Julius John Lankes (1884–1960) was an illustrator, a woodcut print artist, author, and college professor.

Early life and education
Lankes was born on August 31, 1884 in Buffalo, New York to parents of German heritage. His father worked in a lumber mill and brought home small scraps of wood. "It was like getting a daily present," wrote Lankes, who played with and learned about all the different kinds of wood, as a child.  He graduated from the Buffalo Commercial and Electro-Mechanical Institute in 1902 and worked as a draftsman specializing in patent drawings before continuing his art studies at the Art Students' League of Buffalo and the Boston Museum of Fine Arts.

Artist
Lankes worked primarily in the woodcut medium and had studios, at various times, in both Gardenville, New York and Hilton Village in Newport News, Virginia.  His works, numbering about thirteen hundred, helped elevate woodblock prints beyond illustrations in commercial productions to recognition as a fine art.  His work was heavily influenced by the Arts and Crafts movement and by William Morris.

He illustrated works for many notable authors, including American poet Robert Frost, American author Sherwood Anderson, and British author Beatrix Potter.  Lankes maintained lifelong friendships and collaborations with both Robert Frost and Sherwood Anderson.

Major public collections of his woodcut prints are located at the Rauner Special Collections Library, Dartmouth College; the Mead Art Museum, Amherst College; Special Collections & Archives, Middlebury College; the Metropolitan Museum of Art, New York; the Burchfield-Penney Art Center, Buffalo State College; the Virginia State Library, Richmond, Virginia; the Muscarelle Museum of Art, College of William and Mary, Williamsburg, Virginia; and the Crocker Art Museum, Sacramento, California. Other collections include the Congressional Library in D.C.; Newark Public Library in New Jersey; Marsh Museum at University of Richmond, Virginia and the Museum of Fine Arts in Houston. The Pennsylvania Dutch Barn Series is at the Pennsylvania State Museum in Harrisburg and the Doremus Series, designed by Rockwell Kent and engraved by J.J.Lankes, is at Plattsburgh State University in New York.

Career
In 1914, Lankes married Edee Maria Bartlett. In 1915, his first child was born with three more to follow. Having a wife and family to support, he obtained work as foreman of the drafting room at Newton Arms, a rifle factory in Buffalo. In 1917, using a V-cutting tool intended for cross-hatching grips on gunstocks, and a piece of wood from an apple tree blown down by a storm, he cut his first woodblock titled "Flying Gosling."

Lankes received his first opportunity as an illustrator in the woodcut medium from Max Eastman, who edited The Liberator. Lankes found many kindred spirits at the Liberator and was even listed on the masthead as a contributing editor. Like many leftists in the early 20th century, his views grew more moderate later on but he continued to have a great disdain for the bourgeoisie and a deep respect for the working class, which is always evident in his art.

It was Lankes' wife's idea to move to Virginia. Lankes would have a love-hate relationship with the American South for the rest of his life but the move proved to be very fruitful for inspiration and new friends and colleagues. In 1930, Lankes and his Hilton Village neighbor Eager Wood of the Virginia Press, collaborated on Virginia Woodcuts, a folio-sized, limited edition volume of 25 prints of rural Virginia scenes.

Lankes wrote and illustrated A Woodcut Manual, published by Henry Holt in 1932. It was written in a very folksy style and well received by the art and literary community, though not a commercial success in its time. In 2006, The University of Tampa published a new edition of this book with selected letters and other writings, edited by Welford Dunaway 
Taylor.

Lankes wrote a great many letters, collections of which may be found in Buffalo and Erie County Library, Dartmouth College, Amherst (College and town library), Middlebury College, and Wisconsin State Library. A substantial archive of Lankes' writings are with Professor Taylor at the University of Richmond.

In 1933, Lankes was persuaded by Frost to accept a position as visiting Professor at Wells College in Aurora, New York.  He taught at Wells for seven years.

In 1940, Harper & Brothers published an edition of Thomas Gray's Elegy Written in a Country Churchyard, with thirty woodcut illustrations by Lankes and an introduction by Pulitzer prize-winning poet Robert P. T. Coffin. In 1941 Lankes was elected into the National Academy of Design as an Associate member and became a full Academician in 1954.

Lankes produced 41 woodcut renderings of Pennsylvania Dutch barns, some of which were published in the Journal of the American Institute of Architects. A book was planned but never published, which was a great source of disappointment to Lankes, who considered these works to be his crowning achievement.

Later life
Lankes joined the reproduction section, as head of technical illustrating, of the National Advisory Committee for Aeronautics in 1943, where he remained until 1950. In 1951 Lankes moved to Durham, North Carolina. He suffered a debilitating stroke in 1959 and died on April 22, 1960 in Durham. J. J. Lankes was buried in Buffalo on April 25, 1960.

Published works

Published illustrations

References

External links
 
 J.J. Lankes, Wells Book Arts Center
  J.J. Lankes and Robert Frost
 The Tampa Book Arts Studio blog
The Papers of J.J. Lankes in Rauner Special Collections Library, Dartmouth College

American printmakers
Artists from Buffalo, New York
1884 births
1960 deaths
Wells College faculty